Beau Masque (Handsome Face) is  a Franco-Italian film directed by Bernard Paul and released in 1972.

Synopsis
In a region in the east of France, Pierrette, (Dominique Labourier), a young mill worker devotes herself totally to her trade union activity even to the detriment of her private life. She has separated from her husband and left her child in the care of a relative. Two men enter into her life. She crosses first the path of an émigré Italian, nicknamed Beau Masque, (Luigi Diberti), a truck driver.  Then, at the time of a dance organised by the French Communist Party, she makes the acquaintance of Philippe Letourneau (Jean-Claude Dauphin), the factory director. He is the young 'son of the family', pushed into the business by his parents who are majority shareholders. Though attracted to Philippe, Pierrette takes no action, not wanting to compromise her union activity. It is with Beau Masque that she begins a relationship. But a wave of redundancies, that the director does not control, is going to throw the protagonists towards a final drama.

Cast
 Luigi Diberti as Beau Masque
 Dominique Labourier as Pierrette
 Jean-Claude Dauphin as Philippe
 Catherine Allégret as Marguerite
 Gaby Sylvia as Émilie
 Massimo Serato as Valério
 Jean Dasté as Cuvrot
 Hélène Vallier as Louise
 Pierre Maguelon as Mignot
 Evelyne Dress as Nathalie
 Maurice Travail as Tallagrand
 Georges Rouquier as Vizille

Notes
According to Françoise Arnoul, (writing in her memoirs Animal doué de bonheur ), Jane Fonda was the initial choice to play the role of Pierrette but Paramount-France grew less keen on the film the more they looked at it - they thought it too warm to communist ideology. Eventually  Bernard Paul was told Fonda was not available. Location filming took place  in Villerupt, Meurthe-et-Moselle and Ain.

References

External links
 

French romantic drama films
1972 films
Films about the labor movement
Italian romantic drama films
1970s French films
1970s Italian films